Pine Mountain State Scenic Trail is a  trail under development in the U.S. state of Kentucky. Once completed, the trail will wind along Pine Mountain Ridge from the Breaks Interstate Park to Cumberland Gap National Historical Park. The park itself will cover a  band along Pine Mountain. The trail will connect Bad Branch State Nature Preserve and many other natural areas owned by the Office of Kentucky Nature Preserves.

As of May 2014, the trail is completed from the Breaks Interstate Park to Kingdom Come State Park.

Trail sections

The following chart lists the completed trail sections as of May 2014:

Trail rules
 Foot traffic only between US 23 and US 119
 Camping at designated sites only (There are a number of shelters along the trail - check for details on camping.)
 No overnight camping permitted in state nature preserves.
 No overnight parking at state nature preserves.
 Trails have sign-in and sign-out stations that help identify who is and has been on the mountain in the event of an emergency.

References

External links
Pine Mountain Trail Conference
Pine Mountain State Scenic Trail
Pine Mountain Trail at the Office of Kentucky Nature Preserves

Protected areas of Bell County, Kentucky
Protected areas of Harlan County, Kentucky
Hiking trails in Kentucky
State parks of Kentucky
Protected areas of Letcher County, Kentucky
Protected areas of Pike County, Kentucky
Great Eastern Trail